The Dugdale Society is a text publication society for the English county of Warwickshire. It was established in 1920 and named after the distinguished Warwickshire antiquarian Sir William Dugdale.

Selected publications

Main series
Vol.    Title
 I. Minutes and Accounts of the Corporation of Stratford-upon-Avon, Vol I, 1553–1565. 1921	
 II. Abstract of the Bailiffs' Accounts of Monastic and Other Estates in the County of Warwick for the Year ending at Michaelmas 1547. 1923.	
 III. Minutes and Accounts of the Corporation of Stratford-upon-Avon, Vol II, 1566–1577. 1924	
 IV. Records of King Edward's School, Birmingham. Vol I. The 'Miscellany' Volume. 1924	
 V. Minutes and Accounts of the Corporation of Stratford-upon-Avon, Vol III, 1577–1586. 1926	
 VI. The Lay Subsidy Roll for Warwickshire of Edward III. 1928.	
 VII. Records of King Edward's School, Birmingham. Vol. II. 1928.	
 VIII. The Registers of Edgbaston Parish Church. Vol I. 1636–1812. 1928.	
 IX. The Registers of Walter Reynolds, Bishop of Worcester. 1928.	
 X. Minutes and Accounts of the Corporation of Stratford-upon-Avon, Vol IV, 1929.	
 XI. Warwickshire Feet of Fines, Vol I. 1932.	
 XII. Records of King Edward's School, Birmingham. Vol. III. 1933.	
 XIII. Register of the Guild of the Holy Trinity, St Mary, St John the Baptist, and St Katherine of Coventry. Vol. I. 1935.	
 XIV. The Registers of Edgbaston Parish Church. Vol II. 1636–1812. 1928.	
 XV. Warwickshire Feet of Fines, Vol II. 1932.	
 XVI. Rolls of the Warwickshire and Coventry Sessions of the Peace, 1377–1397. 1939.	
 XVII. The Statute Merchant Roll of Coventry, 1392–1416. 1939.	
 XVIII. Warwickshire Feet of Fines, Vol III. 1943.	
 XIX. Register of the Guild of the Holy Trinity, St Mary, St John the Baptist, and St Katherine of Coventry. Vol. II. 1944.	
 XX. Records of King Edward's School, Birmingham. Vol. IV. 1948.	
 XXI. Ministers' Accounts of the Warwickshire Estates of the Duke of Clarence. 1952.	
 XXII. Ecclesiastical Terriers of Warwickshire Parishes. Vol I. 1956.	
 XXIII. Correspondence of the Rev. Joseph Greene, 1712–1790. 1965.	
 XXIV. The Stoneleigh Leger Book. 1960.	
 XXV. Records of King Edward's School, Birmingham. Vol. V. 1963.	
 XXVI. Ministers' Accounts of the Collegiate Church of St Mary, Warwick, 1432–1485. 1969	
 XXVII. Ecclesiastical Terriers of Warwickshire Parishes. Vol II. 1971.	
 XXVIII. Warwickshire Printers' Notices. 1970.	
 XXIX. Warwickshire Apprentices and their Masters, 1710–1760. 1975.
 XXX. Records of King Edward's School, Birmingham. Vol. VI.  A Supplementary Miscellany. 1974.	
 XXXI. Miscellany I. 1977.	
 XXXII. The Langley Cartulary. 1980.	
 XXXIII. Coventry Apprentices and their Masters, 1781–1806. 1983.	
 XXXIV. Coventry Constables' Presentments, 1629–1742. 1986.	
 XXXV. Minutes and Accounts of the Corporation of Stratford-upon-Avon. Vol. V. 1593–1598. 1990.	
 XXXVI. The Great Fire of Warwick, 1694. 1992.	
 XXXVII. The Correspondence of Sir Roger Newdigate of Arbury. 1995.	
 XXXVIII. Coventry and its People in the 1520s. 1999.	
 XXXIX	Stratford-upon-Avon Inventories. Vol.I., 1538–1625. 2002
 XL. Stratford-upon-Avon Inventories. Vol.II., 1626–1699. 2003	
 XLI. The Diaries of Sanderson Miller of Radway. 2005	
 XLII. The Register of the Guild of the Holy Cross, St Mary and St John the Baptist, Stratford-upon-Avon (2007) 
 XLIII. The Warwickshire Hearth Tax Returns (2010) 
 XLIV. Robert Bearman, The Minutes and Accounts of the Corporation of Stratford-upon-Avon and other records, Volume VI, 1599–1609 with index to Volumes 1–6 (2011) 	
 XLV. The Household Account Book of Sir Thomas Puckering of Warwick, 1620. 2012 
 XLVI. Coventry Priory Register. 2013	
 XLVII. The 1851 Census of Religious Worship: Warwickshire. 2014 
 XLVIII. The Newburgh Earldom of Warwick and its Charters 1088-1253. 2015 
 XLIX. Birmingham Wills and Inventories 1512-1603. 2016 
 L. Records of the Warwick District Appeal Tribunal 1916–18 
 LI. The Early Records of Coleshill c.1120-1549 (2018) 
 LII. (Stephanie Appleton and Mairi Macdonald, editors), Stratford-upon-Avon Wills, 1348-1647 (2020) 
 LIII. (Stephanie Appleton and Mairi Macdonald, editors), Stratford-upon-Avon Wills, 1648-1701 (2020)

See also
 Warwickshire County Record Office

References

External links 

1920 establishments in England
History of Warwickshire
Text publication societies
Organisations based in Warwickshire